The Action démocratique du Québec leadership election, 2009 took place on October 18, 2009 electing Gilles Taillon on the second ballot by a margin of two votes over Éric Caire.

Background
After the results of the 2008 Quebec election, in which the ADQ went from being the official opposition, and 39 seats (41 MNA's had been elected in 2007, but two crossed the floor to the Liberals) to the traditional third-party role and seven seats, longtime leader Mario Dumont stepped down from the leadership of the party.

Candidates

Éric Caire
Éric Caire, 43 the MNA for La Peltrie. He was elected in 2007, and has served as the Official Opposition's Shadow Minister of Health.
MNAs who are supporters: Marc Picard, MNA for Chutes-de-la-Chaudière
Federal MPs who are supporters:
Senators who are supporters:
Other high-profile supporters: Film-maker Denis Julien and Joanne Marcotte, former MNA's Richard Merlini, François Benjamin, François Desrochers, Pascal Beaupré, Éric Laporte, Sylvain Légaré, Jean-François Roux, Martin Camirand, Hubert Benoit and Catherine Morissette, former ADQ candidates Ian Senechal, Luigi Verrelli, Guy Boutin, Serge Charette, Marc Jomphe, Martin Briand, Jean Nobert, Bruno Lemieux and Matthew Conway withdrawn leadership candidate, Myriam Taschereau, President of the CDJ Martin-Karl Bourbonnais, President of Marquette Louis-Charles Fortier, founding member of the ADQ Patrick Robitaille,

Christian Lévesque
Christian Lévesque, 39, the former MNA for Lévis. He was elected in 2007 and served as Official Opposition's Shadow Minister for the Treasury Board.
MNAs who are supporters:
Federal MPs who are supporters:
Senators who are supporters:
Other high-profile supporters: Raymond Bréard, the former director-general of the Parti Québécois, Raynald Bernier, former PQ advisor, former MNA's Albert De Martin, Monique Roy Verville, Eric Charbonneau, Jean Damphousse, Claude L'Écuyer

Gilles Taillon
Gilles Taillon, 63, former MNA for Chauveau, and former President of the ADQ and the Conseil du patronat du Québec. He served as Deputy Leader and the Official Opposition's Shadow Minister of Finance. 
MNAs who are supporters (1): François Bonnardel, MNA for Shefford
Federal MPs who are supporters:
Senators who are supporters:
Other high-profile supporters: Former MNA's Linda Lapointe, Pierre Gingras, Lucille Méthé, Lucie Leblanc

Potential candidates who did not enter

Maxime Bernier, 46, Conservative MP for Beauce, and former Minister of Foreign Affairs, said he would not run despite a "Draft Bernier" movement.
François Bonnardel, MNA for Shefford, was considered a potential candidate, but instead endorsed and became a campaign chair for Gilles Taillon.
Gérard Deltell, MNA for Chauveau. Many grassroots supporters had urged him to run, but he declined.
Paul Daniel Muller, former President of the Montreal Economic Institute.
Myriam Taschereau, 38, former Conservative Party of Canada candidate for Québec and Director of Communications for Quebec in the Prime Minister's Office. Declared she would run but then withdrew due to lack of support. She now supports Eric Caire.

Rejected candidates

Jean-François Plante
Jean-François Plante, former Montreal City Councillor (1998–2005) for the Vision Montreal Party, ADQ candidate and owner and host of Radio XTRM, an internet radio show. His campaign was rejected on the grounds the 1,000 signatures he had collected were not valid.

Rules and deadlines
The new leader was elected by all party members through a preferential ballot cast electronically the new leader being announced in early October 2009. Interested parties must collect 1,000 signatures, including at least 60 in a dozen different regions of Quebec. They must also pay a deposit of $15,000.

Results
First Ballot
Caire 41%
Taillon 40%
Lévesque 19%
(Lévesque eliminated)

Second Ballot
Taillon 50.03% (1,957 votes)
Caire 49.97% (1,955 votes)

Turnout: 29%

Polls

CROP Poll, May 26.

Gilles Taillon-21%
Éric Caire-10%
Myriam Taschereau-4%
Christian Lévesque-3%

No favoured candidate-12%
No answer/Don't know-50%

Aftermath
Caire and Marc Picard quit the ADQ caucus shortly after Taillon's victory. Taillon himself resigned as leader less than a month after the leadership election, and was succeeded by Deltell.

References

Quebec
Political party leadership elections in Quebec
2009 leadership convention
2009 in Quebec
Action démocratique du Québec leadership election